Mathira Mohammad, mononymously known as Mathira, is a Pakistani-Zimbabwean model, dancer, television hostess, singer, and actress. She has hosted several television shows and appeared in music videos. She is known for her item songs in Main Hoon Shahid Afridi and the Indian Punjabi film Young Malang.

Early life and career 
Mathira was born into a Muslim family in Harare, Zimbabwe to a South African father and Pakistani mother. Her sister Rose Muhammad is also an actress. She was educated in Zimbabwe before moving to Pakistan with her family amid unrest in Zimbabwe. She made her debut in music videos of Jadugar, Desi Beat and "Nachdi Kamal" by Malkoo and Woh Kaun Thi by Rizwan-ul-Haq and "Jotha Tu Hai" by Arbaz Khan. In March 2011, she got a chance to host a late-night programme Love Indicator on Vibe TV.

Mathira then shot for the cover of a leading Pakistani fashion magazine. In 2011, she also hosted an AAG TV's show Baji Online. In 2013, she made her debut in Bollywood by doing an item song "Lakk Ch Current" in Indian Punjabi film Young Malang. She has also done an item number "Masti Mein Doobi Raat Hai" in the film Main Hoon Shahid Afridi starring Humayun Saeed. She then appeared in the music video of the song "Jhootha" with young rapper Arbaz Khan, which was released on 30 December 2013.

In 2014, she acted in a film directed by Vipin Sharma. In 2015, she has featured in a song "Piya Re" with Furqan and Imran by paying the tribute to Adnan Sami Khan's song "Bheegi Bheegi Raaton Mein".

From 2017 to 2019, she played a supporting character in Geo Kahani's series Naagin. In 2019, she was seen in the romance-thriller film Sirf Tum Hi To Ho opposite Danish Taimoor.

Personal life 
Mathira married Punjabi singer Farran J Mirza (also known as Flint J) in 2012. The couple has a son, Aahil Rizvi who was born in September 2014. The couple separated in January 2018.

Filmography

Films

Television

Music videos

Discography
Featured in
"Piya Re" – Furqan and Imran feat. Mathira

See also
 List of Pakistani actresses
 Meera
 Veena Malik

References

External links 
 
 

Living people
1992 births
Actresses from Karachi
Singers from Karachi
People from Harare
Pakistani film actresses
Pakistani television actresses
Pakistani female models
Pakistani television hosts
Pakistani women television presenters
Zimbabwean people of Pakistani descent
Zimbabwean people of South African descent
Zimbabwean emigrants to Pakistan
Pakistani people of South African descent
Actresses in Punjabi cinema
Pakistani expatriate actresses in India
21st-century Pakistani women singers
21st-century Pakistani actresses